"No Pares" (English: "Don't Stop") is a song by the Mexican band RBD, from their second live album, Live in Hollywood (2006). It was the first and only single released from the album. The song was written by Lynda Thomas and performed by Dulce María.

Song information
"No Pares" is included twice, once as the acoustic live version, taken from the original Los Angeles concert in the Pantages Theatre, and the other one being the studio version. Both versions were used as radio singles.

No official music video was shot for the song. Therefore, a live performance taken from the [[Live in Hollywood (RBD video album)|Live in Hollywood]] DVD was used to promote the song. The video was edited to promote "No Pares" on many music channels and cut for the opening for the telenovela Rebelde''.

"No Pares" also won Cancion Latina 2007 (Latin Song 2007) for Orgullosamente Latino Award.

Track listing
"No Pares" (studio version) - 3:47
"No Pares" (live acoustic version) - 4:15

Release history

Awards

References

2006 singles
RBD songs
Spanish-language songs
Pop ballads